Yuri Nilovich Yevlampyev (born 19 June 1966) is a former Russian professional footballer.

Club career
He made his debut in the Russian Premier League in 1992 for FC Fakel Voronezh.

External links
 

1966 births
People from Cheboksary
Living people
Russian footballers
FC Fakel Voronezh players
PFC Krylia Sovetov Samara players
FC Luch Vladivostok players
Russian Premier League players
FC Kristall Smolensk players
Association football midfielders
FC Dynamo Bryansk players
Sportspeople from Chuvashia
20th-century Russian people
21st-century Russian people